Governor's Square is a super-regional shopping mall located on Apalachee Parkway in Tallahassee, Florida. Its two-level design was a first for northern Florida when it opened in 1979, and was for many years the newest of two enclosed malls in the Tallahassee area, the other being The Centre of Tallahassee, formerly the Tallahassee Mall. The anchor stores are currently JCPenney, Macy's, and Dillard's. 

Built into a hillside, the mall can be entered either on the first or second level, depending on where a particular entrance is located.  The mall's original anchors stores were J. C. Penney, Sears, and Maas Brothers. Maas Brothers was converted to Burdines in 1991. In March 2005, the Burdines store was converted to a Macy's.

A 1993 expansion included an additional wing as well as Dillard's becoming the fourth anchor.

On December 28, 2018, Sears announced that it would be closing its Governor's Square anchor store as part of a plan to close 80 stores nationwide. The store closed in March 2019. During the COVID-19 pandemic, the vacant store served as a Florida Department of Health monoclonal antibody treatment site.

In 2015 the Governor's Square Mall received a $10 million interior and exterior renovation. 

The mall lies within a relatively affluent trade area less than two miles (3 km) east of downtown.

References

External links
 Governor's Square

Shopping malls in Florida
Buildings and structures in Tallahassee, Florida
Tourist attractions in Tallahassee, Florida
Shopping malls established in 1979
Brookfield Properties
1979 establishments in Florida